Sakuda is a surname. Notable people with the surname include:

Kevin Sakuda (born 1980), American soccer player
, Japanese footballer

See also
Moses ole Sakuda, Kenyan politician

Japanese-language surnames